Lena Marie Lutz (born 12 July 2001) is a Swiss ice hockey player and member of the Swiss national ice hockey team, currently playing in the Women's League (SWHL A) with the Hockey Team Thurgau Ladies.

Lutz represented Switzerland in the women's ice hockey tournament at the 2022 Winter Olympics in Beijing and at the 2021 IIHF Women's World Championship. As a junior player with the Swiss national under-18 team, she participated in the IIHF Women's U18 World Championships in 2017, 2018, and served as team captain in 2019.

References

External links
 
 

Living people
2001 births
Swiss women's ice hockey forwards
Olympic ice hockey players of Switzerland
Ice hockey players at the 2022 Winter Olympics